Giacomo Minutoli or Jacques Minutoli (died 1485) was a Roman Catholic prelate who served as Bishop of Agde (1476–1485)
and Bishop of Nocera Umbra (1472–1476).

Biography
On 12 Oct 1472, Giacomo Minutoli was appointed during the papacy of Pope Sixtus IV as Bishop of Nocera Umbra.
On 17 Aug 1476, he was appointed during the papacy of Pope Sixtus IV as Bishop of Agde.
He served as Bishop of Agde until his death in 1485.

References

External links and additional sources
 (for Chronology of Bishops) 
 (for Chronology of Bishops) 

15th-century Italian Roman Catholic bishops
Bishops appointed by Pope Sixtus IV
1485 deaths